is a former Japanese football player.

Club statistics

References

External links

1982 births
Living people
Seisa Dohto University alumni
Association football people from Tokyo
Japanese footballers
J2 League players
Hokkaido Consadole Sapporo players
Mito HollyHock players
Zweigen Kanazawa players
Association football midfielders